Transitional shelter is any of a range of shelter options that help people affected by conflict or natural disasters who have lost or abandoned their housing until they can return to or recover acceptable permanent accommodation. The term refers to an incremental process rather than a product, in which a shelter can be:
 
 upgraded into part of a permanent house; 
 reused for another purpose; 
 relocated from a temporary site to a permanent location; 
 resold, to generate income to aid with recovery; and 
 recycled for reconstruction.

This relatively new terminology arose to fill a conceptual gap in traditional refugee camp disaster responses, which left populations living often for many years in decrepit emergency shelter. There is debate however on the cost effectiveness of this type of shelter solution because of repeated costs incurred with delivering; first tarps, then tents, then transitional shelter, then permanent housing.  Several organizations have developed a shelter solution that deploys at the same time a tent usually deploys, however; the shelter itself transitions through the various phases of recovery and stays with the recipient.  This type of transitional shelter reduces the costs of redeployment and provides security from the very onset of the disaster.

Transitional shelter, in its fullest sense, is a strategy which seeks to support communities back to permanent accommodation, minimising displacement, and taking into account town planning, sanitation, land tenure, human rights, neighbouring populations, the local economy, security, and cultural factors. Refugee camps are considered one of a range of options, including use of host families, self settlement, and cash donations for building materials.

In the narrower sense, a transitional shelter is a structure in which usually a family can live, with dignity, for as long as their permanent accommodation takes to build or restore. Ideally it will be built from local materials according to local methods, and be adaptable to climate and culture. It will be located adjacent to the destroyed accommodation, and can be disassembled and the materials reused or resold.

External links
 transitional settlement: displaced populations
 An Assessment of Sphere Humanitarian Standards for Shelter and Settlement Planning in Kenya's Dadaab Refugee Camps

References

Buildings and structures by type
Refugee camps
Temporary populated places
Disaster preparedness
Emergency services